Route 148 is a highway in northwestern Missouri.  Its northern terminus is at the Iowa state line where it continues as Iowa Highway 148.  Its southern end is at U.S. Route 71 / U.S. Route 136 northeast of Maryville.  It is one of the few highways in Missouri with an even number, but designated as a north–south route; Route 112 and Route 108 also are.

Route description

Route 148 begins at U.S. Route 71 and U.S. Route 136 northeast of Maryville. North of Pickering, Route 148 crosses the 102 River and continues for  until it enters Hopkins, where it meets the western end of Route 246. Two miles (3.2 km) north of Hopkins, Route 148 enters Iowa and becomes Iowa Highway 148.

History
Route 148 was initially Route 27, established in 1922 between Savannah and Iowa. The part south of Mayville became part of US 71 in 1926, but the rest remained until it was renumbered to match Iowa Highway 148 in 1969.

On September 14, 1933, Route 148 (then Route 27) north of Hopkins was the scene of a gun fight between the Missouri Highway Patrol and Harold B. Thornbrugh, a Kansas outlaw who was wanted for the murder of Omaha, Nebraska special duty police officer Otto Peterson.  Thornbrugh was killed and a trooper wounded.

Major intersections

References

148
Transportation in Nodaway County, Missouri